Mario Magnozzi (20 March 1902 – 25 June 1971) was an Italian footballer who played as a forward. He competed in the 1928 Summer Olympics with the Italy national team.

Club career
Magnozzi was born in Livorno, and played for his home-town team from 1920 until 1930. In 1920 Livorno won the Torneo del Sud, after which it was defeated by Inter (winner of Torneo del Nord) in the final for the overall Italian title. The match finished 3–2 for Internazionale, with both of Livorno's goals being scored by Magnozzi. During the 1924–25 season with Livorno, he was the top scorer in Serie A. In 1930 he moved to A.C. Milan, where he served as the club's captain, and remained there until 1932, when he was sold back to Livorno. He remained there until he retired in 1936.

International career
Magnozzi was a member of the Italy national team which won the bronze medal in the football tournament at the 1928 Summer Olympics, and winning the 1927–30 Central European International Cup & making runner-up in the 1931–32 Central European International Cup.

Managerial career
As a football coach, Magnozzi led Milan, Lecce, AEK and Livorno, helping the latter club to Serie A promotion after winning the 1936–37 Serie B title.

Honours

Player
Italy
 Central European International Cup: 1927-30
 Central European International Cup: Runner-up: 1931-32
 Summer Olympics: Bronze 1928

Individual
Serie A top scorer: 1924–25 (19 goals, with Livorno)

Manager
Livorno
Serie B: 1936–37

References

External links
 
 
 
 Profile

1902 births
1971 deaths
Sportspeople from Livorno
Italian footballers
Footballers at the 1924 Summer Olympics
Footballers at the 1928 Summer Olympics
Olympic footballers of Italy
Olympic bronze medalists for Italy
Italy international footballers
Association football forwards
Italian football managers
Serie A players
Serie B players
U.S. Livorno 1915 players
Serie A managers
A.C. Milan players
A.C. Milan managers
U.S. Lecce managers
AEK Athens F.C. managers
Olympic medalists in football
Medalists at the 1928 Summer Olympics
Footballers from Tuscany